Samara Governorate was an administrative division (a guberniya) of the Russian Empire and Russian SFSR, located in the Volga Region. It existed from 1850 to 1928; its seat was in the city of Samara.

Administrative divisions 
The governorate was divided into seven uyezds (counties). These were:
 Bugulminsky Uyezd
 Buguruslansky Uyezd
 Buzuluksky Uyezd
 Nikolayevsky Uyezd
 Novouzensky Uyezd
 Samarsky Uyezd
 Stavropolsky Uyezd

References 

 
1851 establishments in the Russian Empire
1928 disestablishments in Russia
States and territories disestablished in 1928
States and territories established in 1851